The 2015 NCAA Division II baseball Tournament decided the baseball champion at the NCAA Division II level for the 2015 season. The Tampa Spartans won their seventh national championship, beating the Indians of Catawba College in the national championship. Tampa catcher Nick Tindall was named tournament Most Outstanding Player, while Tampa head coach Joe Urso won his fourth championship with the Spartans.

Regionals

Atlantic Region–Erie, PA
Hosted by Mercyhurst at Jerry Uht Park

Central Region–St. Cloud, MN
Hosted by St. Cloud State at Joe Faber Field

East Region–Rindge, NH
Hosted by Franklin Pierce at Pappas Field

Midwest Region–St. Charles, MO
Hosted by Lindenwood at Lou Brock Sports Complex

South Region–Livingston, AL
Hosted by West Alabama at Tartt Field

South Central Region–Grand Junction, CO
Hosted by Colorado Mesa at Suplizio Field

Southeast Region–Thomasville, NC
Hosted by Catawba at Finch Field

West Region–Walnut, CA
Hosted by Cal Poly Pomona at Mazmanian Field

College World Series

Participants

Results

Bracket
Hosted by University of Mount Olive and Town of Cary at USA Baseball National Training Complex.

Game results

References

NCAA Division II Baseball Tournament
NCAA Division II baseball tournament